Kleinia implexa is a species of flowering plant in the genus Kleinia and family Asteraceae which was previously considered to be a species of Senecio.

References

External links

implexa
Flora of East Tropical Africa